Streptopelia is a genus of birds in the pigeon and dove family Columbidae. These are mainly slim, small to medium-sized species. The upperparts tend to be pale brown and the underparts are often a shade of pink. Many have a characteristic black-and-white patch on the neck and monotonous cooing songs.

The heartland of this genus is Africa, but several species occur in tropical South Asia. As a group, this genus is highly successful; many species are abundant in a range of habitats in the tropics and two now have a much more extensive distribution. The Eurasian collared dove (Streptopelia decaocto) naturally expanded out of its original range of the warmer temperate regions from southeastern Europe to Japan to colonise the rest of Europe, reaching as far west as Great Britain by 1960 and Ireland soon after. It has also been introduced into the U.S. and, as of 1999, it had been reported from 22 states and was still spreading rapidly.

Taxonomy
The genus Streptopelia was introduced in 1855 by the French ornithologist Charles Lucien Bonaparte. The name is from the Ancient Greek στρεπτός (streptós) – literal meaning "twisted" but, by extension, "wearing a torc" (i.e., twisted metal collar) – and πέλεια (péleia) meaning "wild dove". Also in 1855, the English zoologist George Robert Gray designated the type species as Streptopelia risoria, the Barbary dove. Although Streptopelia risoria has been confirmed as a valid name by the International Commission on Zoological Nomenclature, the Barbary dove may be a domesticated form of the African collared dove (Streptopelia roseogrisea).

A DNA sequence analysis has concluded that the genus consists of three distinct lineages. One contains the laughing dove and the spotted dove, which have long been recognized as having distinct morphology and behavior. The second group contains most of the other species, except for the Malagasy turtle dove and the pink pigeon, which appear to be the surviving species of an endemic Madagascar/Mascarenes radiation and have at times been placed in other genera. The two-species lineages appear to be each other's closest relatives and cannot be firmly assigned to either Columba or Streptopelia (although overall they seem to be close to the latter). Thus, it might be best to split the two minor lineages off as distinct genera, namely Spilopelia for the first (which, although not having priority over Stigmatopelia, which occurs earlier on the page, is chosen on the first reviser principle) and Nesoenas for the second.

Species 

The genus contains 15 species:
 European turtle dove Streptopelia turtur
 Dusky turtle dove, Streptopelia lugens
 Adamawa turtle dove, Streptopelia hypopyrrha
 Oriental turtle dove Streptopelia orientalis
 Sunda collared dove, Streptopelia bitorquata
 Philippine collared dove, Streptopelia dusumieri
 Eurasian collared dove, Streptopelia decaocto
Burmese collared dove, Streptopelia xanthocycla
 African collared dove, Streptopelia roseogrisea
 White-winged collared dove, Streptopelia reichenowi
 Mourning collared dove, Streptopelia decipiens
 Red-eyed dove, Streptopelia semitorquata
 Ring-necked dove, Streptopelia capicola
 Vinaceous dove, Streptopelia vinacea
 Red collared dove, Streptopelia tranquebarica

The genera Spilopelia and Nesoenas were formerly placed in Streptopelia, but have since been separated out to make the genus monophyletic.

References

 
Bird genera
Taxa named by Charles Lucien Bonaparte